El Guabo is a corregimiento in Chagres District, Colón Province, Panama with a population of 1,330 as of 2010. Its population as of 1990 was 1,191; its population as of 2000 was 1,180.

References

Corregimientos of Colón Province